Saint-Georges-de-Rouelley (literally Saint-Georges of Rouelley) is a commune in the Manche department in Normandy in north-western France.

See also
Communes of the Manche department
Parc naturel régional Normandie-Maine

References

Saintgeorgesderouelley